KSG can refer to:

Kansas State Guard, a state defense force active in World War II
John F. Kennedy School of Government
Knight of St. Gregory, a class in one of the orders of knighthood of the Holy See
Kel-Tec KSG shotgun
Kungstensgymnasiet (KSG)
Kids See Ghosts, an American hip hop duo
Kids See Ghosts (album), the duo's eponymous debut album
Górnik Zabrze, abbreviated as "Klub Sportowy Górnik"